Grzegorz Krzosek (born 10 January 1976 in Lębork) is a retired Polish middle-distance runner who specialised in the 800 metres. He represented his country at the 2001 World Championships in Athletics without qualifying for the semifinals.

Competition record

Personal bests
Outdoor
600 metres – 1:16.08 (Bogatynia 2005)
800 metres – 1:45.97 (Bydgoszcz 2001)
1000 metres – 2:22.31 (Siedlce 2001)

Indoor
800 metres – 1:47.74 (Chemnitz 2006)

References

1976 births
Living people
Polish male middle-distance runners
People from Lębork
Sportspeople from Pomeranian Voivodeship